Leptopilos is a genus of ground spiders that was first described by G. Levy in 2009.

Species
 it contains ten species:
Leptopilos butleri Haddad & Booysen, 2022 – Botswana, Zimbabwe, South Africa
Leptopilos digitus Haddad & Booysen, 2022 – South Africa
Leptopilos hadjissaranti (Chatzaki, 2002) – Greece (Crete)
Leptopilos lakhish Levy, 2009 – Israel
Leptopilos levantinus Levy, 2009 – Greece, Israel, Iran
Leptopilos manolisi (Chatzaki, 2002) – Greece (Crete), Israel
Leptopilos memorialis (Spassky, 1940) – Bulgaria, Greece, Ukraine, Russia (Europe to Central Asia), Kazakhstan, Pakistan, Mongolia
Leptopilos pupa (Dalmas, 1919) – Egypt
Leptopilos tenerrimus (O. Pickard-Cambridge, 1872) (type) – Libya, Israel
Leptopilos vasivulva Haddad & Booysen, 2022 – Botswana, Zimbabwe, South Africa

References

Araneomorphae genera
Gnaphosidae
Spiders of Africa
Spiders of Asia